Baseball is a minor sport in Switzerland.

History

The sport has its foundation in the early 1980s.

The governing body for baseball in the country is the Swiss Baseball and Softball Federation. Championnat de Suisse de baseball is the national professional baseball league (NLB & NLA).

Bibliography 
 Peter C. Bjarkman, Diamonds Around The Globe: The Encyclopedia Of International Baseball, Greenwood Press, 2004
 Josh Chetwynd, Baseball in Europe: A Country by Country History, McFarland & Co Inc, 2008

References

Baseball in Switzerland